Nanjing City Football Club is a professional Chinese football club that currently participates in the China League One. The team is based in Nanjing, Jiangsu.

History
The club was founded on 29 December 2014 as Nanjing Fengfan F.C. and participated within the Nanjing City League Second Division by the Nanjing Civil Affairs Bureau. Initially formed as youth football training club, on 1 November 2017, the club completed their Chinese Football Association (CFA) registration to participate within the Nanjing Football Association Super League and take part within the Chinese football pyramid. A seventh place finish and eighth place finish in the 2018 league season would be enough to qualify for the 2019 Chinese Champions League where they won the division title and promotion to the China League Two.

In January 2021, Nanjing Fengfan F.C. changed their name to Nanjing City.

Players

Current squad

Managerial history
  Yin Youyou (2018–2019)
  Tang Bo (2020)
  Fulvio Pea (2021–present)

Results
All-time league rankings

As of the end of 2020 season.

Key
 Pld = Played
 W = Games won
 D = Games drawn
 L = Games lost
 F = Goals for
 A = Goals against
 Pts = Points
 Pos = Final position

 DNQ = Did Not Qualify
 DNE = Did Not Enter
 NH = Not Held
 – = Does Not Exist
 R1 = Round 1
 R2 = Round 2
 R3 = Round 3
 R4 = Round 4

 F = Final
 SF = Semi-finals
 QF = Quarter-finals
 R16 = Round of 16
 Group = Group stage
 GS2 = Second Group stage
 QR1 = First Qualifying Round
 QR2 = Second Qualifying Round
 QR3 = Third Qualifying Round

References

External links
Club Website

Football clubs in China
Association football clubs established in 2014
Sport in Nanjing
2014 establishments in China